Frederick Hard (18981981) was an American Shakespearean scholar and academic administrator. He was the second and longest-serving president of Scripps College, a women's college in Claremont, California, from 1944 to 1964.

References

Heads of universities and colleges in the United States
1898 births
1981 deaths
Shakespearean scholars
Scripps College people
People from Claremont, California